Amjad Tawalbeh (born 3 January 1965) is a Jordanian racewalker. He competed in the men's 20 kilometres walk at the 1984 Summer Olympics.

References

1965 births
Living people
Athletes (track and field) at the 1984 Summer Olympics
Jordanian male racewalkers
Olympic athletes of Jordan
Place of birth missing (living people)